Kikko is a type of Japanese samurai armor.

Kikko may also refer to:
 'Kikko' or 'Kikko-Chiku', a variety of the Phyllostachys edulis bamboo
 Kikko Matsuoka (born 1947), a Japanese actress
 Tatami-do